The University of Alabama (informally known as Alabama, UA, or Bama) is a public research university in Tuscaloosa, Alabama. Established in 1820 and opened to students in 1831, the University of Alabama is the oldest and largest of the public universities in Alabama as well as the University of Alabama System. It is classified among "R1: Doctoral Universities – Very high research activity". 

The university offers programs of study in 13 academic divisions leading to bachelor's, master's, education specialist, and doctoral degrees. The only publicly supported law school in the state is at UA. Other academic programs unavailable elsewhere in Alabama include doctoral programs in anthropology, communication and information sciences, metallurgical engineering, music, Romance languages, and social work. 

As one of the first public universities established in the early 19th century southwestern frontier of the United States, the University of Alabama has left a cultural imprint on the state, region, and nation over the past two centuries. The school was a center of activity during the American Civil War and the Civil Rights Movement. The University of Alabama varsity football program (nicknamed the Crimson Tide), which was inaugurated in 1892, ranks as one of the ten winningest programs in US history. In a 1913 speech then-president George H. Denny extolled the university as the "capstone of the public school system in the state [of Alabama]", lending the university its current nickname, The Capstone. In addition, university alumni and faculty include 59 Goldwater Scholars, 15 Rhodes Scholars, 16 Truman Scholars, 36 Hollings Scholars, and 16 Boren Scholars.

History

Establishment

In 1818, the United States Congress authorized the newly created Alabama Territory to set aside a township for the establishment of a "seminary of learning". When Alabama was admitted to the Union on December 14, 1819, a second township was added to the land grant, bringing it to a total of 46,000 acres (186 km2). The General Assembly of Alabama established the seminary on December 18, 1820, named it "The University of the State of Alabama", and created a board of trustees to manage the construction and operation of the university. The board selected a construction site and an architect to design the campus. The site the board chose was, at the time, outside the city limits of the erstwhile state capital, Tuscaloosa. William Nichols, the architect of the Alabama State Capitol building and Christ Episcopal Church in Tuscaloosa, was chosen to design the campus.

The university's charter was presented to the first university president in the nave of Christ Episcopal Church. UA opened its doors to students on April 18, 1831, with the Reverend Alva Woods as president. An academy-style institution during the Antebellum period, the university emphasized the classics and the social and natural sciences. There were around 100 students per year at UA in the 1830s.

As the state and university matured, an active literary culture evolved on campus and in Tuscaloosa. UA had one of the largest libraries in the country on the eve of the Civil War with more than 7,000 volumes. There were several thriving literary societies, including the Erosophic and the Phi Beta Kappa societies, which often had lectures by such distinguished politicians and literary figures as United States Supreme Court justice John Archibald Campbell, novelist William Gilmore Simms, and professor Frederick Barnard. The addresses to those societies reveal a vibrant intellectual culture in Tuscaloosa; they also illustrate the proslavery ideas that were so central to the university and the state.

Discipline and student behavior were a major issue at the university almost from the day it opened. Early presidents attempted to enforce strict rules regarding conduct. Students were prohibited from drinking, swearing, making unauthorized visits off-campus, or playing musical instruments outside a one-hour time frame. Yet riots and gunfights were not uncommon. To combat the severe discipline problem, president Landon Garland lobbied and received approval from the legislature in 1860 to transform the university into a military school.

From the Civil War to World War II
Many of the cadets who graduated from the school served as officers in the Confederate Army during the Civil War. As a consequence of that role, Union troops burned down the campus on April 4, 1865, only 5 days before Lee's surrender at Appomattox Court House. Despite a call to arms and defense by the student cadet corps, only four buildings survived the burning: the President's Mansion (1841), Gorgas House (1829), Little Round House (1860), and Old Observatory (1844). The university reopened in 1871 and in 1880, Congress granted the university 40,000 acres (162 km2) of coal land in partial compensation for $250,000 in war damages.

The University of Alabama allowed female students beginning in 1892. The Board of Trustees allowed female students largely due to Julia S. Tutwiler, with the condition that they be over eighteen, and would be allowed to enter the sophomore class after completing their first year at another school and passing an exam. Ten women from Tutwiler's Livingston school enrolled for the 1893 fall semester. By 1897, women were allowed to enroll as freshmen.

During World War II, UA was one of 131 colleges and universities nationally that took part in the V-12 Navy College Training Program, which offered students a path to a Navy commission. During this time the University of Alabama had extensions in other cities including Mobile; the University of South Alabama was opened in 1963 to replace that program.

Racial integration

Until the 1960s, the university admitted only white students. The practice of racial segregation was common in the American South at this time and the university barred all students of color from attending. The first attempt to integrate the university occurred in 1956 when Autherine Lucy successfully enrolled on February 3 as a graduate student in library sciences after she secured a court order preventing the university from rejecting her application on the basis of race. In the face of violent protests against her attendance, Lucy was suspended (and later outright expelled) three days later by the board of trustees on the basis of being unable to provide a safe learning environment for her. The university was not integrated until 1963 when Vivian Malone and James Hood registered for classes on June 11.

Governor George Wallace made his infamous "Stand in the Schoolhouse Door", standing in the front entrance of Foster Auditorium in a symbolic attempt to stop Malone and Hood's enrollment. When confronted by U.S. deputy attorney general Nicholas Katzenbach and federal marshals sent in by Attorney General Robert F. Kennedy, Wallace stepped aside. President John F. Kennedy had called for the integration of the University of Alabama as well. Although Hood dropped out of school after two months, he returned and, in 1997, received his PhD in philosophy. Malone persisted in her studies and became the first African American to graduate from the university. In 2000, the university granted her a doctorate of humane letters. Autherine Lucy's expulsion was rescinded in 1980, and she re-enrolled and graduated with a master's degree in 1992. Later in his life, Wallace apologized for his opposition at that time to racial integration. In 2010, the university formally honored Lucy, Hood and Malone by rechristening the plaza in front of Foster Auditorium as Malone-Hood Plaza and erecting a clock tower – Autherine Lucy Clock Tower – in the plaza.

2011 tornado

On April 27, 2011, Tuscaloosa was hit by a tornado rated EF4 on the Enhanced Fujita scale, which left a large path of complete destruction but spared the campus. Six students who lived on off-campus premises were confirmed dead by the university. Due to the infrastructural damage of the city (approx. 12% of the city) and the loss of life, the university canceled the rest of the spring semester and postponed graduation.

Campus

From a small campus of seven buildings in the wilderness on the main road between Tuscaloosa and Huntsville (now University Boulevard) in the 1830s, UA has grown to a massive  campus in the heart of Tuscaloosa. In 2010, the school added 168 acres to its campus by purchasing the land formerly belonging to Bryce Hospital. It also plans to acquire more land to accommodate the continuing growth of the enrollment.

The university maintains the University of Alabama Arboretum in eastern Tuscaloosa and the Dauphin Island Sea Lab on Dauphin Island, just off the Alabama Gulf Coast. In 2011, the Sustainable Endowments Institute gave the university a College Sustainability Report Card grade of "B+".

Landmarks
UA is home to several museums, cultural facilities and historical landmarks.

The Alabama Museum of Natural History at Smith Hall exhibits Alabama's rich natural history. The oddest artifact there could be the Sylacauga meteorite, the largest known extraterrestrial object to strike a human being who survived. The Paul W. Bryant Museum houses memorabilia and exhibits on the history of UA athletic programs, most notably the tenure of football coach Paul "Bear" Bryant. Athletic trophies and awards are displayed at the Mal Moore Athletic Facility, named for the university's former athletic director, near the Bryant Museum. The Sarah Moody Gallery of Art at Garland Hall hosts revolving exhibitions of contemporary art, including from the university's own permanent collection. The Ferguson Art Gallery at the University of Alabama Student Center also hosts revolving art exhibitions. The Jones Archaeological Museum at Moundville exhibits the history of Mississippian culture in Alabama.

Numerous historical landmarks dot the campus, including the President's Mansion, Denny Chimes, Foster Auditorium (a National Historical Landmark), the Gorgas–Manly Historic District, and Maxwell Observatory.

A cemetery next to the Biology building includes the graves of two slaves who were owned by faculty members before the Civil War. Both men died in the 1840s, and their graves went unmarked until 2004.

Campus culture facilities include the Allen Bales Theatre, the Marion Gallaway Theatre, Morgan Auditorium, and the Frank M. Moody Music Building, which houses the Tuscaloosa Symphony Orchestra and the UA Opera Theatre, as well as three resident choirs.

Organization and administration

The University of Alabama is an autonomous institution within the University of Alabama System, which is governed by the Board of Trustees of the University of Alabama and headed by the chancellor of the University of Alabama. The state legislature created the board to govern the university's operations. Its responsibilities include setting policy for the university, determining the university's mission and scope, and assuming responsibility for the university to the public and the legislature. The board is self-perpetuating and composed of 15 members and two ex officio members. The Constitution of the State of Alabama dictates the board's makeup and requires the board to include three members from the congressional district that contains the Tuscaloosa campus and two members from every other congressional district in Alabama. Board members are elected by the board and are confirmed by the Alabama State Senate. Board members may serve three consecutive six-year terms.

The president of the University of Alabama is the principal executive officer of the university and is appointed by the chancellor with approval of the board of trustees. The president reports directly to the chancellor and is responsible for the university's daily operations. The president's office is on the third floor of the Rose Administration Building, and the president has the privilege of living in the President's Mansion on campus. Stuart R. Bell became the 29th university president on July 15, 2015.

Academic staff 
In fall 2020, UA employed 6,947 staff, including 1,986 instructional staff (faculty) and 2,375 professional staff. 18.2% of the faculty was non-white and 48% were women. 72% of faculty held a doctorate or the highest degree in their field. 50.4% of faculty were tenured or tenure-tracked. 23.6% of faculty were adjunct, clinical, or otherwise part-time.

Colleges and academic divisions

The College of Arts and Sciences (CAS) is the university's college for the liberal arts, fine arts, and sciences. It is the largest of the university's 13 colleges, with approximately 9,800 undergraduate students and 1,000 graduate students. Most core curriculum classes and majors and minors are part of the college.

There are 12 other academic divisions at the University of Alabama (see the table above). Eight divisions (CAS, C&BA, C&IS, Education, Engineering, HES, Nursing, and Social Work) grant undergraduate degrees. Degrees in those eight divisions at the master's, specialist, and doctoral level are awarded through the Graduate School. The law school offers JD and LL.M. degree programs. CHS provides advanced studies in medicine and related disciplines and operates a family medicine residency program. Medical students are also trained in association with the University of Alabama School of Medicine, from which they receive their degree.

The College of Continuing Studies provides correspondence courses and other types of distance education opportunities for non-traditional students. It operates a distance education facility in Gadsden.

Founded in 1971 and merged into the College of Arts and Sciences in 1996, the New College's stated objectives were to "create an opportunity for a highly individualized education that enables students to draw from the resources of all University classes and faculty" and to "serve as an experimental unit with the expectation of exporting successful innovations to other sectors of the University." The college allows undergraduate students flexibility in choosing their curriculum while completing a Bachelor of Arts or Bachelor of Science degree in interdisciplinary studies. The New College Review, a non-fiction cultural journal, is written, edited, designed, and published by students.

The Honors College is a non-degree granting division that encompasses all the university's selective undergraduate honors programs.

Endowment
The University of Alabama System's financial endowment was valued at $1.520 billion in the National Association of College and University Business Officers' (NACUBO) 2019 listings. UA's portion of the system's endowment was valued at $885.7 million in September 2015.

Academics

Admissions

Undergraduate

In fall 2021, Alabama received 42,421 applications for first-time freshman enrollment, from which 33,472 applications were accepted (78.9%) and 7,593 freshmen enrolled, a yield rate (the percentage of accepted students who choose to attend the university) of 22.7%. Alabama's freshman retention rate is 88.6%, with 72.1% going on to graduate within six years.

The university started test-optional admissions with the Fall 2021 incoming class and has extended this through Fall 2024. Of the 63% of enrolled freshmen in 2021 who submitted ACT scores; the middle 50 percent Composite score was between 21 and 31. Of the 17% of the incoming freshman class who submitted SAT scores; the middle 50 percent Composite scores were 1080-1370. 

The University of Alabama is a college-sponsor of the National Merit Scholarship Program and sponsored 189 Merit Scholarship awards in 2020. In the 2020–2021 academic year, 223 freshman students were National Merit Scholars.

Classification 
The University of Alabama is classified among "R1: Doctoral Universities – Very high research activity". It is a large, four-year primarily residential university accredited by the Southern Association of Colleges and Schools. Full-time, four-year undergraduates comprise a large amount of the university enrollment. The undergraduate instructional program emphasizes professional programs of study as well as the liberal arts, and there is a high level of co-existence between the graduate and undergraduate program. The university has a very high level of research activity and has a "comprehensive doctoral" graduate instructional program in the liberal arts, humanities, social sciences. health sciences (medical school), and STEM fields.

UA began offering engineering classes in 1837. It was one of the first universities in the nation to offer an engineering degree. Over the last decade, UA has greatly expanded its science and engineering programs, in terms of numbers of students, faculty hired, and number and size of new academic/research facilities (almost 1 million in new square footage). UA's College of Engineering enrolls more students than any other engineering program in the state as of 2016. UA's freshman engineering classes have also had the highest average ACT score among all state of Alabama engineering programs for the last several years.

Degrees conferred 

Ten of the university's thirteen academic units (see above) offer degree programs in at total of 117 areas of study. Two areas, economics and health care management, are offered jointly by separate units (Commerce and Business Administration and Arts & Sciences for both), and one area (material science) is offered jointly by the other universities in the UA system.

UA conferred 7,905 degrees in the 2020-21 academic year, including 7,367 bachelor's degrees (3,579 with Latin honors), 1,859 master's degrees, 245 doctorates and 119 professional degrees.

Latin honors are conferred on graduates completing a bachelor's degree for the first time (including at other universities) with an overall grade point average of at least 3.5. Cum laude honors are conferred to graduates with a GPA of 3.5 or greater and less than 3.7 (without rounding). Magna cum laude honors are conferred with a GPA of 3.7 or greater and less than 3.9. Summa cum laude honors are conferred with a GPA of 3.9 or higher.

Academic calendar 
The university follows a standard academic calendar based on the semester system, which divides the academic year, starting in mid-August, into two 15-week semesters (fall and spring) and the summer. The fall semester ends in December and the spring term lasts from January to early May. The summer, which lasts from mid-May to August, is divided into a 3-week "mini-semester" in May and two four-week sessions in June and July, respectively.

Rankings

In the 2021 U.S. News & World Report rankings, UA was tied for 143rd in the National Universities category (tied for 65th among "Top Public Schools"). Additionally, in the 2021 U.S. News rankings, the law school was tied for 31st in the nation, the business school was tied for 41st, the education school tied for 84th, and the engineering school was tied for 119th. In 2016, Business Insider ranked the UA law school as the third best public law school in the nation.

In August 2020, the University of Alabama's College of Communication & Information Sciences was recognized for having the nation's top public relations program. The UA Department of Advertising and Public Relations was named the Most Outstanding Education Program by PRWeek during the 2020 PRWeek Awards. It is the department's ninth recognition as a finalist for the award and first selection as the top program.

As of 2021 The Princeton Review ranks University of Alabama first in the nation as a party school, and first for having lots of Greek life. The university is also ranked the 8th most LGBT unfriendly school in the nation.

Libraries

The University of Alabama has 2.9 million document volumes, along with nearly 100,000 uncatalogued government documents in its collection; of these 2.5 million volumes are held by the University Libraries. The University Libraries system has six separate libraries.

The Amelia Gayle Gorgas Library, which sits on the Main Quad, is the oldest and largest of the university libraries. Gorgas Library holds the university's collections in the humanities and social sciences, as well as the university's depository of US government documents. The library opened in 1939 as a four-story Greek Revival structure on the site of the original university Rotunda and was named after the long-time university librarian and wife of eighth university president Josiah Gorgas. A seven-story addition was built behind the library in the 1970s.

The Angelo Bruno Business Library, in the Business Quad, is named after the co-founder of the Bruno's grocery chain who gave the university $4 million to create a library focusing on commerce and business studies. Bruno Library also houses the  Sloan Y. Bashinsky Sr. Computer Center.

The Eric and Sarah Rodgers Library for Science and Engineering, in the Science and Engineering Quad, is named after two popular, long-time professors of engineering and statistics, respectively. It opened in 1990, combining the Science Library collection in Lloyd Hall and the Engineering Library collection in the Mineral Industries Building (now known as HM Comer Hall). Rodgers Library was designed with help from IBM to incorporate the latest in informatics. McLure Education Library was founded in 1954 in a remodeled student union annex (across the street from the old Student Union, now Reese Phifer Hall) and named in 1974 after John Rankin McLure, the longtime dean of the College of Education. The William Stanley Hoole Special Collections Library, which holds the university's collection of rare and historical documents and books, is in Mary Harmon Bryant Hall. The Library Annex holds seldom-used books and journals, as well as other volumes which need special protection, that would otherwise take up valuable space in the libraries.

Other libraries on campus are independent of the University Libraries. The  Bounds Law Library, at the Law Center, holds more than 300,000 volumes. Established in 1978, the Health Sciences Library, at the University Medical Center, serves students at the College of Community Health Sciences. Its 20,000-volume collection includes clinical medicine, family practice, primary care, medical education, consumer health, and related health care topics. Located in Farah Hall (home of the Department of Geography) the Map Library and Place Names Research Center holds over 270,000 maps and 75,000 aerial photographs. The William E. Winter Reading Room of the College of Communication and Information Sciences is in Reese Phifer Hall and holds over 10,000 volumes. The School of Social Work Reading Room is in Little Hall and just around 200 volumes.

UA is one of the 126 members of the Association of Research Libraries, which yearly compiles internal rankings. In 2011, the University of Alabama ranked 56th among all criteria, a marked improvement over a 2003 ranking of 97th.

This expansion also signaled the beginning of the construction of an Academic Honors Plaza, between the library and Clark Hall. The plaza includes green-space, fountains, benches, and decorative lighting.

Research
In academic year 2014–2015, UA received $76 million in research contracts and grants. The Alabama International Trade Center and the Center for Advanced Public Safety are two research centers at UA.

The US Department of Homeland Security has selected The University of Alabama as a National Center of Academic Excellence (CAE) in Information Assurance Education and Research.

SECU: SEC Academic Initiative
The University of Alabama is a member of the SEC Academic Consortium. Now renamed the SECU, the initiative was a collaborative endeavor designed to promote research, scholarship and achievement amongst the member universities in the Southeastern conference. The SECU formed its mission to serve as a means to bolster collaborative academic endeavors of Southeastern Conference universities. Its goals include highlighting the endeavors and achievements of SEC faculty, students and its universities and advancing the academic reputation of SEC universities.

In 2013, the University of Alabama participated in the SEC Symposium in Atlanta, Georgia which was organized and led by the University of Georgia and the UGA Bioenergy Systems Research Institute. The topic of the symposium was titled "The Impact of the Southeast in the World's Renewable Energy Future".

Student life

Student body

In fall 2021, the university had an enrollment of 38,320 students, consisting of 31,688 undergraduates and 6,152 postgraduates, from all 67 Alabama counties, all 50 US states and the District of Columbia, and 78 foreign nations. Alabama residents comprised 41.4% of the undergraduate student body; out-of-state residents comprised 55.4%, and international (non-resident alien) students comprised 3.2%.

The five Alabama counties with the highest enrollment of students were Tuscaloosa (3,158 students), Jefferson (2,836), Madison (1,295), Shelby (1,290) and Mobile (988), while the five states (beside Alabama) with the highest enrollment of students were Georgia (2,518 students), Texas (1,709), Illinois (1,649), Florida (1,550), and Tennessee (1,465).

In 2013, UA ranked 1st in the nation among public universities in the enrollment of National Merit Scholars.

Residential life
The board of trustees chose to locate the UA campus in a field a mile away from the center of the town of Tuscaloosa (which was a considerable distance in early 19th century Alabama). The board consciously chose to make on-campus residence an integral part of the student experience at UA. Dormitories were among the first buildings erected at Alabama (the remains of one [Franklin Hall] is now the Mound on the Quad), and student residential life has been emphasized at UA ever since. Dormitories at the university include Blount Hall, Bryant Hall, Burke Hall, Harris Hall, John England, Jr. Hall, Lakeside Hall, Parham Hall, Paty Hall, Presidential Village I and II, Riverside Hall, Tutwiler Hall, and Ridgecrest East, West, and South. There are also two on-campus apartment complexes, Bryce Lawn and the Highlands. Today nearly 30% of students live on campus, including over 90% of first-year freshmen.

Student government
The Student Government Association is the primary student advocacy organization at UA. The SGA is governed by the SGA Constitution and consists of a legislative branch, an executive branch and a judicial council.

SGA controversy

Since its founding in 1914, a secretive coalition of fraternities and sororities, commonly known as "The Machine", has wielded enormous influence over the Student Government Association. Occurrences of harassment, intimidation, and even criminal activities aimed at opposition candidates have been reported. Many figures in local, state, and national politics have come out of the SGA at the University of Alabama. Esquire devoted its April 1992 cover story to an exposé of The Machine. The controversy led to the university disbanding the SGA in 1993, which wasn't undone until 1996. "Machine" fraternities and sororities have traditionally accepted only white pledges, with only one documented case of an African American student being offered entry, in 2003.

Controversy surrounding The Machine reemerged in August 2013, when sororities and fraternities were mobilized to elect two former SGA presidents, Cason Kirby and Lee Garrison, in closely contested municipal school board races. Before election day, questions about illegal voter registration were raised when evidence emerged that indicated eleven fraternity members fraudulently claimed to be living in a single house in one district. And on election day, leaked emails suggested that sorority/fraternity members may have been provided incentives to vote—including free drinks at local bars. As a result of possible voter fraud, Kirby's opponent filed a lawsuit challenging the election results and University of Alabama faculty have questioned whether The Machine has corrupted the democratic process in the City of Tuscaloosa.

Greek life

Greek letter organizations (GLOs) first appeared at the university in 1847 when two men visiting from Yale University installed a chapter of Delta Kappa Epsilon. When DKE members began holding secret meetings in the old state capitol building that year, the administration strongly voiced its disapproval. Over a few more decades, 7 other fraternities appeared at UA: Alpha Delta Phi in 1850, Phi Gamma Delta in 1855, Sigma Alpha Epsilon in 1856 (this was the founding chapter), Kappa Sigma in 1867, Sigma Nu in 1874, Sigma Chi in 1876, and Phi Delta Theta in 1877. Anti-fraternity laws were imposed that year, but were lifted in the 1890s. Women at the university founded the Zeta chapter of Kappa Delta sorority in 1903. Alpha Delta Pi soon followed.

Strenuous hazing rituals among UA fraternities to test prospective member's manhood, as with fraternal groups at most American colleges, have always been a major concern of the UA administration. The Atlanta Journal Constitution newspaper reported male students receiving "100 licks with a paddle" by fellow male students multiple times back in the 1890s. Serious injuries in fraternities are a reoccuring issue.

In fall 2009, the university sanctioned 29 men's and 23 women's GLOs. Additionally, an unknown number of non-sanctioned GLOs existed. Four governing boards oversee the operations of the university-sanctioned GLOs: the Interfraternity Council (IFC), the National Panhellenic Conference (NPC), the National Pan-Hellenic Council (NPHC) and the Unified Greek Council (UGC).

The number of men in GLOs more than doubled from 2002 to 2009, with fifteen fraternities reporting active memberships of more than 100 (where as recently as 2001 none reported memberships greater than 100). Following 2008 fall recruitment, almost all Panhellenic sororities participating through all rounds had potential new member class sizes of 80 or more; nearly all Panhellenic sororities also now have more than 200 total members. To accommodate growth in the student population since 2005, the university has sanctioned three new fraternities and two new sororities. Additionally, four new sorority houses were added, built behind the President's Mansion.

Despite having the first non-white student initiated into a historically white Greek organization on campus in 2000, high segregation within Alabama's Greek system has long been considered a major point of concern due to many other public college Greek systems becoming more integrated. John P. Hermann, a now-retired English professor, tried in the 1990s and 2000s to end what he referred to as "taxpayer-supported segregation". Controversy erupted again in September 2013, when a story in the campus paper, The Crimson White, revealed that alumnae of Greek organizations had prevented a black student from being accepted in an all-white sorority. As a result, the Alabama Panhellenic Association allowed recruitment to continue through continuous open bidding. According to TIME, a deal that would allow black students to join historically white sororities was announced by the university as "the first step toward ending more than a century of systematic segregation in the school's sorority system".

With over 10,000 active students, UA has one of the largest Greek systems in the nation. Since 2003, NIC and NPC organizations at UA have spent over $200 million renovating and building new multimillion-dollar Greek mansions to remain competitive in recruiting and retaining members. In 2019, 29% of male undergraduates were in university-sanctioned fraternities; 44% of female undergraduates were in university-sanctioned sororities.

In 1987, the Theta Sigma chapter of Alpha Kappa Alpha became the first historically black Greek organization and only historically black sorority with a house on Greek row. The previous year before moving to the sorority side of Greek row, the house AKA was making arrangements to acquire had burning crosses on the front lawn. UA officials claimed it was a distasteful prank but the local black community disputed that claim saying it was a serious threat against integrating Greek row. Two white male students were briefly detained for questioning but they were not charged with anything and their full identity and Greek affiliations were never released. The Kappa Alpha chapter of Alpha Phi Alpha is the first and only historically black fraternity with a house on fraternity row.

The eight National Pan-Hellenic Council (NPHC) organizations represented on campus are listed below.

Fraternities
 Alpha Phi Alpha
 Kappa Alpha Psi
 Omega Psi Phi
 Phi Beta Sigma

Sororities
Alpha Kappa Alpha
Delta Sigma Theta
Zeta Phi Beta
Sigma Gamma Rho

Honor societies
Several honor societies are present at the University of Alabama. Some honor societies are national organizations with a local chapter while others are local organizations.

 Alpha Epsilon Delta
 Alpha Lambda Delta
 Alpha Psi Omega
 Arnold Air Society
 Blue Key
 Jasons Senior Men's Honorary
 Kappa Kappa Psi
 Lambda Pi Eta
 Lambda Sigma
 Mallet Assembly
 Mortar Board
 National Society of Collegiate Scholars
 Order of Omega
 Omicron Delta Kappa
 Phi Alpha Theta
 Phi Beta Kappa
 Phi Eta Sigma
 Phi Mu Alpha Sinfonia
 Phi Kappa Phi
 Pi Mu Epsilon
 Sigma Alpha Lambda
 Sigma Delta Pi
 Sigma Tau Delta
 Who's Who

Student media
The Crimson White is the student-produced newspaper. Published two times a week during the academic year and weekly during the summer, the CW normally distributes 15,000 copies per publication. The CW received a 2010 Mark of Excellence Award for "Best All-Around Daily Student Newspaper at a Four-Year College or University" in the Southeast region by the Society of Professional Journalists. The CW won the Mark of Excellence Award again in 2011 and a Gold Crown Award from the Columbia Scholastic Press Association for its spring 2011 issues. The Crimson White was also inducted into the College Media Hall of Fame for its coverage of the April 2011 tornado that caused massive damage in Tuscaloosa. Other UA student publications include the "Blount Truth Literary Journal", "Marr's Field Journal", and "Alice".

Athletics and traditions

The University of Alabama's intercollegiate athletic teams are known as the Alabama Crimson Tide (this name can be shortened to Alabama, the Crimson Tide, or even the Tide). The nickname Crimson Tide originates from a 1907 football game versus Auburn University in Birmingham where, after a hard-fought game in torrential rain in which Auburn had been heavily favored to win, Alabama forced a tie. Writing about the game, one sportswriter described the offensive line as a "Crimson Tide", in reference to their jerseys, stained red from the wet dirt.

Alabama competes primarily in the Southeastern Conference (Western Division) of the NCAA's Division I. Alabama fields men's varsity teams in football, basketball, baseball, golf, cross country, swimming and diving, tennis, and track and field. Women's varsity teams are fielded in basketball, golf, cross country, gymnastics, rowing, soccer, softball, swimming and diving, tennis, track and field, and volleyball. The athletic facilities on campus include the Bryant–Denny Stadium, named after legendary football coach Paul "Bear" Bryant and former UA President George Denny, and the 14,619-seat Coleman Coliseum. Alabama's women's rowing team competes in the Big 12 conference of the NCAA's Division I.

Alabama maintains athletic rivalries with Auburn University and the University of Tennessee. The rivalry with Auburn is especially heated as it encompasses all sports. The annual Alabama-Auburn football game is nicknamed the Iron Bowl. While the rivalry with Tennessee is centered around football for the most part, there is no shortage of acrimony, especially given the recent history between then-UT Coach Phillip Fulmer and his relationship to the Tide's most recent NCAA probation. There are also rivalries with Louisiana State University (football and baseball), University of Mississippi (football and men's basketball), Mississippi State University (football, men's basketball), University of Georgia (women's gymnastics), and the University of Florida (football, softball).

Football

The University of Alabama football program, started in 1892, has won 25 SEC titles and 18 national championships (including 12 awarded by the Associated Press and 8 by the Coaches Poll). The program has compiled 36 10-win seasons and 59 bowl appearances, winning 32 of them – all NCAA records. Alabama has produced 18 hall-of-famers, 97 All-Americans honored 105 times, and 4 Heisman trophy winners (Mark Ingram II, Derrick Henry, DeVonta Smith, and Bryce Young).

The Crimson Tide's current home venue, Bryant–Denny Stadium, opened in 1929 with a capacity of around 12,000. The most recent addition of the stadium was completed in 2010. An upper deck was added in the south end zone, completing the upper deck around the stadium. The current official capacity of the stadium is 101,821. The previous addition was the north end zone expansion, completed 2006. The Tide has also played many games, including the Iron Bowl against rival Auburn University, at Legion Field in Birmingham.

Nearly synonymous with Alabama football is legendary coach Paul "Bear" Bryant whose record at the University of Alabama was 232–46–9. He led the Crimson Tide to 6 national titles in 1961, 1964, 1965, 1973, 1978, and 1979. Alabama's current head football coach Nick Saban has won a total of 7 national titles, including six at Alabama. Additionally, the 1966 team was the only one in the country to finish with a perfect record, but poll voters denied the 12–0 Alabama team the three-peat as Michigan State and Notre Dame played each other to a 10–10 tie in what was considered the "Game of the Century" and subsequently split the national championship.

On December 12, 2009, sophomore running back Mark Ingram II was awarded the Heisman Trophy as college football's best player. In being so named, Ingram became the first Heisman Trophy winner for the University of Alabama. Alabama defeated Texas 37–21 in the BCS Championship game on January 7, 2010, capping a perfect season, an SEC Championship, and winning its first national championship in the BCS era. Alabama defeated Louisiana State University 21–0 on January 9, 2012, to win its second BCS National Championship. Alabama won its third BCS National Championship in January 2013 defeating Notre Dame 42–14, becoming the first school to win three BCS Titles. On January 1, 2015, No. 1 Alabama lost to No. 4 Ohio St. in the second game of the first College Football Playoffs 42–35. On December 12, 2015, running back Derrick Henry was awarded the Heisman Trophy, becoming only the second winner for the University of Alabama. On January 11, 2016, Alabama defeated Clemson to win the National Championship, 45–40. In January 2017, Alabama lost to Clemson 35–31 in the National Championship. They beat SEC rival Georgia 26–23 in overtime during the 2018 National Championship in January 2018. In January 2019, Alabama lost to Clemson 44–16 in the National Championship. In the 2020 season, Alabama earned a 13–0 record against an all-SEC schedule during the COVID-19 pandemic including winning the SEC Championship against Florida, the Rose Bowl against Notre Dame, and the National Championship game against Ohio State. Crimson Tide Wide Receiver DeVonta Smith was awarded the Heisman Trophy, the program's third  winner. In the 2021 season, the Crimson Tide would post a 13-2 record, including a 41-24 win over Georgia in the SEC championship game to win their 29th conference title. They would then go on to beat the Cincinnati Bearcats 27-6 in the Cotton Bowl, culminating in an eventual loss to Georgia in the National Championship by a score of 33-18. Along with a successful football season, Alabama's starting quarterback, Bryce Young, won the Heisman trophy - becoming the 4th player from the university to win it, and the 1st quarterback from the University to win it.

School songs
The school's fight song is "Yea Alabama", written in 1926 by Lundy Sykes, then editor of the campus newspaper. Sykes composed the song in response to a contest by the Rammer Jammer to create a fight song following Alabama's first Rose Bowl victory. The song as it is played by the Million Dollar Band during games and known to most people is simply the chorus of the larger song. The Alabama Alma Mater is set to the tune of Annie Lisle, a ballad written in the 1850s. The lyrics are usually credited as, "Helen Vickers, 1908", although it is not clear whether that was when it was written or if that was her graduating class.

Alumni

University of Alabama graduates include 15 Rhodes Scholars, 59 Goldwater Scholars, and 16 Truman Scholars. UA graduates have also been named to the USA Today All-USA College Academic Team.

The University of Alabama is the alma mater of numerous notable people in politics, sports, business, entertainment, science, art, and literature. Among UA's alumni are Harper Lee, Bear Bryant, Mel Allen, Joe Namath, George Wallace, Jim Nabors, Joe Scarborough, Hugo Black, E. O. Wilson, poet Honorée Fanonne Jeffers, and Wikipedia founder Jimmy Wales.

Notes

References

External links

 
 University of Alabama Athletics website
 

 
Educational institutions established in 1831
Universities and colleges accredited by the Southern Association of Colleges and Schools
Education in Tuscaloosa, Alabama
University of Alabama
Flagship universities in the United States
Buildings and structures in Tuscaloosa, Alabama
Tourist attractions in Tuscaloosa, Alabama
1831 establishments in Alabama
University of Alabama